Boltonia diffusa, the smallhead doll's daisy, is a North American species of plants in the family Asteraceae. It native to the United States, primarily the states along the Gulf of Mexico from Texas to Florida plus the lower Mississippi Valley from Louisiana to Illinois. There additional populations in the eastern United States as far north as Virginia.

Boltonia diffusa is a small perennial rarely more than 20 cm (8 inches) high. It spreads by stolons (horizontal stems running along the surface of the ground). It has many daisy-like flower heads with white or lavender ray florets and yellow disc florets.

Varieties
 Boltonia diffusa var. diffusa - coastal regions and Mississippi Valley
 Boltonia diffusa var. interior Fernald & Griscom - Mississippi Valley

References

External links
Illinois Natural History Survey
Illinois Wildflowers
Southeastern Flora

Astereae
Flora of the United States
Plants described in 1823
Garden plants